The Norinco JW-103 'Bush Ranger' is a centrefire bolt-action hunting rifle developed and exported by China North Industries Corporation of the People's Republic of China. The rifles are manufactured at Norinco's Hebei Plains Machinery Factory (No. 396 State Factory).

Overview
The Norinco JW-103 is part of Norinco's 'Jian Wei' series of sporting rifles which began in 1955. The JW-103s development began in 1993 to create a rifle for the lucrative foreign hunting market. The design for this new rifle was finalized in June 1995 with mass production put underway by the end of the same year. The rifle's design is based around the Norinco JW-15A, a Chinese produced copy of the Czech .22 LR Brno ZKM-451, itself a modernized variant of the popular CZ 452 rimfire rifle. The JW-103 uses a Mauser bolt action system and the receiver is made from both milled and forged steel while the barrel has a heavy blued finish. The rifle uses Russian designed 7.62×39mm cartridges which are fed from a detachable, single column 5 round box magazine, and is drilled and tapped for weaver scope ring bases, which can be used to mount various types of scopes. The JW-103 has no sights while the JW-105 has front and rear sights. The rear sight is mounted on the barrel. The Norinco JW-103 and JW-105 are commercially available in many countries such as Australia, Canada, France, Germany and New Zealand.

Variants
The sole variant of the JW-103 is the Norinco JW-105 'Bush Ranger' rifle which is chambered for the .223 Remington cartridge. The JW-105 rifle is slightly longer and heavier than the JW-103. The JW-105 also has a front sight but is otherwise identical to the JW-103, but the JW-105 has a higher muzzle velocity than the JW-103. The JW-105 began development in 1999 with the target of expanding into the overseas hunting market by designing a rifle that would better appeal to shooters who may prefer the .223 Remington over the 7.62×39mm round. The JW-105's design was approved in March 2001 and with mass production starting immediately afterwards. The JW-103 and 105 are often advertised as light and reliable hunting rifles available at a lower price than that of similar rifles. The JW-103 is unrelated to the "Norinco JW-101" rifle, which was a copy of the Zastava M48 bolt-action rifle and which never entered mass production.

See also
 Norinco
 CZ 452
 CZ 550

References

External links
 Norinco Main page

7.62×39mm bolt-action rifles
Mauser rifles
Firearms of the People's Republic of China
Norinco